Dia Frampton (born October 2, 1987) is an American musician, singer and songwriter. Frampton is the lead singer of the band Meg & Dia, was the runner-up in the inaugural season of The Voice, and is perhaps most known for her presence and collaborations in the EDM world, having worked with DJs such as Illenium and Kaskade among many others.

Life and career

Early life
Dia Frampton attended Dixie High School in St. George, Utah and Shadow Ridge High School in Las Vegas, Nevada. Dia graduated early by homeschooling her senior year, and at the same time attending public school. Dia then moved to Salt Lake City with her sister to further their music career. She cites Modest Mouse, Tom Petty and the Heartbreakers, Joni Mitchell, The Avett Brothers, Rocky Votolato, Ben Folds, Etta James, Death Cab for Cutie, The Cranberries, and Cursive as influences. During live performances, Frampton plays percussion instruments, such as the cowbell and tambourine, and occasionally a Casio Privia keyboard. She almost always performs without shoes on. She also does not like to eat anything within two hours of performing. Her father is an American of English and Dutch ancestry and her mother is Korean, originally from Seoul.
Frampton often recorded a "song diary," an impromptu recorded song, on her MySpace page. She explained, "It was something very raw, and to be honest, something that I was slightly embarrassed to put up because of the quality but I did anyways, for any of our listeners who would care to hear something not hot off the production belt, but something more organic and 'home made.' It made me feel better to share my feelings with people who could connect, and I think that is what happened with many."

2005–2011: Meg and Dia 

Along with her sister Meg, Frampton was part of the five-piece alternative rock band Meg & Dia. The band released their debut album "Our Home is Gone" in 2005 (at the time the band was just a two-piece) and later released Something Real under Doghouse Records, which peaked at No. 12 on the Billboard Heatseekers Chart. The band found success by promoting their music on MySpace, leading them to become the official MySpace band on the Warped Tour 2006.

Meg & Dia's profile in the rock scene continued to grow, leading to continued appearances at the Warped Tour, touring with bands such as Angels & Airwaves and a record deal with Warner Bros. Records. This deal yielded the pop-rock leaning Here, Here and Here, which charted at No. 103 on the Billboard 200.

In 2010, Warner Bros. dropped the band, reverting the group back to their indie status. Nonetheless, the band released their fourth studio album,  Cocoon, which was received positively by fans and critics, but failed to perform well commercially, leading to Dia's manager, Mike Kaminsky, suggesting she audition for The Voice

2011: The Voice
Dia Frampton was a contestant (and eventual runner-up) on the first season of The Voice on NBC, introduced as a children's story author. Frampton stated that she had originally joined the show only with the intention of promoting Cocoon and had not expected that she would make it that far in the competition. She was selected to be on the team of coach Blake Shelton, who stated, "when I heard your voice, I started to smile." Frampton advanced through the show's quarter-finals and semi-finales after renditions of "Heartless" and "Losing My Religion". Notably, the aforementioned singles were the highest charting iTunes digital songs by any contestant on The Voice during its respective voting eligibility period, with "Inventing Shadows" topping the charts at No. 1. Following the season finale on June 29, 2011, "Inventing Shadows" debuted at No. 20 on the Billboard Hot 100 with 137,000 downloads sold. As of July 7, 2011, Frampton's The Voice digital releases have sold 480,000 downloads.

Frampton subsequently won the title of Entertainment Weekly'''s 2011 'Favourite Reality Show Personality' over Michael Stagliano from the second season of Bachelor Pad.

Performances on The Voice

2011–2013: Red and embarking on solo career

Frampton's single, "The Broken Ones," was released on November 15, 2011, and her solo album, Red, was released on December 6, 2011. Frampton wrote (or co-wrote) every song on Red. Notable co-written songs include "Billy the Kid", which she wrote with Mark Foster and Isom Innis, lead singer and keyboard player for Foster the People respectively, "Hearts out to Dry," which she wrote with her sister, Meg, and "Bullseye," which she wrote with Isabella Summers, the keyboard player for Florence and the Machine.

She was the opening act for her coach, Blake Shelton, on his Well Lit & Amplified tour. Shelton insisted that she had earned her spot on his tour and he was not doing her any favors. She later was a supporting act for The Fray in their sold out US tour in the Midwest and the West Coast from April to May 2011. Her own solo US tour took place from February to July 2012, with Canadian singer-songwriter Andrew Allen as her opening act.

Meg & Dia (whose members had joined Dia on the Blake Shelton tour) confirmed their disbandment in October 2012.

She covered the Korean song, "Lonely" by 2NE1, as an acoustic ballad in English for allkpop.com to promote her later concert in Seoul, Korea. On December 30, 2012, she sang a solo of "Heartless" and performed "We Are The Champions" with the final 8 of The Voice of Vietnam. In January 2013, Dia held a small tour, staging concerts across Southeast Asian countries Vietnam, Singapore, Philippines, Thailand, Malaysia and Indonesia. She also collaborated with Singto Numchok on his singles "Gift" and "Coffee Mate" in Thailand.

2013–2015: ARCHIS and new EP

Frampton was featured on "Heart On the Floor", which is a track on The Summer Set's new album, Legendary. The album was released on April 16, 2013.  She was also featured on Never Shout Never's Christmas EP, singing "Under the Mistletoe" and on The Crystal Method's new single "Over It", which was featured on their self-tiled album on January 14, 2014.
As of January 2014, Dia is now the opening act for the James Blunt Moon Landing Tour.
On April 29, 2014 Lindsey Stirling released her album Shatter Me on which Dia collaborated on the songs "We Are Giants" and "Shatter Me". She was also featured in the single "Stay" by Australian DJ tyDi which was released on April 8, 2014.

In June 2014, it was announced that after the release of "Red," Frampton had been dropped from Universal Republic. It was also announced that her new album would be an EP, and not a solo album but under the name of her new band, ARCHIS. Two singles were released on this EP, "Blood" and "I Need You." The music video for "Blood" was released on June 2, 2014. In August 2014, Frampton announced that Archis had been signed to a new label, and that the EP would be released in January 2015. The EP was produced by her frequent collaborator Joseph Trapanese.

On March 17, Interscope Records released Insurgent: Original Motion Picture Soundtrack. The song "Holes In the Sky" was written by Anthony Gonzalez and Dia Frampton and is performed by M83 and HAIM.

2015–2018: Bruises LP
After the release of ARCHIS's EP, the band began working on a full-length LP, to be released in early 2016. However, after releasing a personal essay in August 2016 it was revealed that the LP would be released under her own name and would be titled Bruises. Frampton also revealed that the LP would be produced by Dan Heath. On October 5, 2016, she premiered the lead single off the LP titled "Golden Years." The single was released on October 7, 2016, as part of an EP with the same name, serving as a preview for the LP which was released on March 3, 2017. To coincide with the pre-order of "Bruises" becoming available, Frampton released another single, "Gold & Silver". After the album's release, Frampton released music videos for the tracks "Don't Look Back", "Dead Man" and "Crave". The latter two being given official single treatment. Throughout 2017 and 2018, Frampton continued to release music in the form of collaborations and guest appearances with other artists. These include Jason Ross, Witt Lowry, Illenium, Kaskade, tyDi, Dabin and Christopher Tin. Frampton has also pursued acting, appearing in Criminal Minds and several short films. In December 2017, Frampton released "Yule Tunes" as an EP, consisting of 3 cover songs and one original Christmas song – "The Nice List".

 2019–present: Meg & Dia reunion 
On April 1, 2019, it was announced that Meg & Dia were to reunite for select dates of the 2019 Warped Tour. On July 26, the group (now a duo, with former guitarist Gimenez returning as a touring member) surprise-released their  fifth studio album "happysad" through Pure Noise Records and released music videos for tracks "American Spirit" and "Teenagers". The group also embarked on the Happysad Tour'' in support of the record. The group also released a Christmas single, "December, Darling" on November 1 – with the full length "December, Darling" LP arriving on the 15th.

The group supported Amber Liu on her 24-date North American Tour X in January and February 2020.

Discography

Albums

Extended plays

Singles

Songwriter and features

Videography

Music videos

Filmography

References

External links
 

1987 births
Living people
American people of Dutch descent
American people of English descent
American people of Korean descent
American women singer-songwriters
Guitarists from Utah
Musicians from Salt Lake City
People from St. George, Utah
The Voice (franchise) contestants
21st-century American women guitarists
21st-century American guitarists
21st-century American women singers
Nettwerk Music Group artists
21st-century American singers
Singer-songwriters from Utah